Sunshower (stylized in all caps) is the second studio album by Taeko Ohnuki, released on July 25, 1977. The album combines elements of J-pop, smooth jazz, rock, and city pop. A commercial disappointment at the time of its release, the album later garnered critical acclaim.

Background 
According to the producer Seiji Kuniyoshi, it was more crossover-flavored than the first album which was closer to Sugar Babe. In those days, crossover was established and everyone was influenced more or less, so this direction was set naturally in the meeting for album production. It was decided that all songs would be arranged by Ryuichi Sakamoto, and also that the most talked-about musicians at the time would participate. On the other hand, they were thinking about adding a something like "authentic" flavor to it. At such time, in April 1977, a four-day benefit concert entitled the "Rolling Coconut Review" in Tokyo was held, and since Stuff participated in it, Kuniyoshi and others attended it in order to watch that jazz-funk band's stage. "Oh, this is it!" they got excited and had negotiation on the participation of the drummer Chris Parker on the spot. Kuniyoshi said it became a critical factor in determining the result of this album.

They decided to call in Parker from New York for 26 days from May 13 to June 6, and all the arrangements had to be completed before the drummer entered the studio. As a result, it was made in the shortest time among the albums that Ohnuki has made.

"When it comes to Sunshower," Ohnuki said, "the record company was not too keen on it, and also around that time the contracted agency dissolved, then there were none of others around me, leaving only Sakamoto and me. So, "I'll make it as I like!" I felt that way, regardless of whether the sales would well or not." According to her, just then, came so-called fusion or crossover, she was listening to it all the time, and she ended up being interested in the sound production and being sound oriented entirely. "In spite of I was a vocalist after all, I forgot about singing a little," she said, "I wonder if the sound was a little too noticeable, but I think it was a good album in those days. Also Sakamoto really put a lot of effort into it and made good arrangements".

In 2015, a 7" vinyl single coupled with "Tokai" and "Kusuri wo Takusan" was released as a limited edition.

Songs 
Time (Is) of Sputnikmusic pointed out that the album benefits from two things: "it has the infectious catchiness of your regular old pop song in unison with soothing harmonies and a smoking hot band laying down grooves bound to worm its way into your head, and it has the capability to experiment with the pop art form and could afford to take risks with deep cuts such as the delicate ambiance of 'Sargasso Sea' and the classical-meets-funk fusion 'Furiko no Yagi' to back it up."

Side A 
 "Summer Connection" – The opening number, "energetic and uplifting." The lyrics were written in the image of summer.
 "Kusuri wo Takusan" (くすりをたくさん; literally: "A Lot of Medicine") – A song criticizing the over-prescription of medicine. Rolling Stone Jon Blistein wrote, "the funkiest song you'll ever hear about neurotic patients and the doctors all too happy to feed their angst with lots and lots of prescription drugs."
 "Nani mo Iranai" (何もいらない; literally: "I don't need anything") – Back then, Ohnuki was negative about the society and the surrounding environment, and she felt like washing away the whole world like rain and starting over from the beginning.
 "Tokai" (都会; literally: "City") – Yannick Gölz of laut.de wrote that the groove on this number "is alive, and the play of piano, drums and brass sounds dynamic, but the vocals of Ohnuki carry a formless melancholy in itself." According to Ohnuki, she has lived in Tokyo for a long time, been always particular about the city and the town, has sung such songs, and though it's often said that the loneliness, still she likes the city. However here, denies and criticizes the bright lights in the city. This is a her favorite song, and she said, "'Tokai' has a good arrangement, [...] . It's a bit like Stevie Wonder."
 "Karappo no Isu" (からっぽの椅子; literally: "Empty Chair") – A song about the loneliness in living alone, which was sung at Sugar Babe's last concert, too. It was made with the image of slow numbers in jazz, but Ohnuki didn't mean to make it completely jazz.

Side B 
 "Law Of Nature" – It was composed in the image of Todd Rundgren's Utopia which Ohnuki liked. She said that it too, is a song which is critical, or raises a question and that it focuses on the desire to be natural.
 "Dare no Tame ni" (誰のために; literally: "For Whom") – According to Ohnuki, it's exactly a feeling of "a cry from the weak"—an appeal to the fact that you can't be recognized without a status or an honor and describes how much you can stick to your belief.
 "Silent Screamer" – This song is about the desire to escape, too and it's strong that an image of driving a car at a breakneck speed. According to Ohnuki, back then, the energy was quite full and at least in the music, she wanted to run wild.
 "Sargasso Sea" – A song sang on the theme of the Sargasso Sea, known for the legend of the ships being stranded and entangled with algae. Gölz said that it is a highlight of the second half and created some of the record's most fascinating musical textures: "Through fast, shrill synthesizer tremolos and from conspicuous high tones, the song creates a lost, nautical ambient atmosphere, short piano melodies create a sense of secluded wanderlust [...] —a striking contrast to the hitherto urban ambience."
 "Furiko no Yagi" (振子の山羊; literally: "Goat of the Pendulum") – The music was composed by Sakamoto and has the intro part by symphonic orchestra. It is symbolically described that things like end-time of humankind and the reincarnation.

Artwork 
Regarding the cover artwork based on white, Japanese studies scholar Laurence Green of SOAS University of London described that there's something about the cover art that presents a quiet, comfortable confidence, resting pretty in a chic, distinctly Japanese minimalism of white, and its unadorned style has utterly modernist in outlook, and yet somehow also avante-garde, primitive in its simplicity.

Reception 

Compared to her first album which drew a certain amount of attention, sales were lackluster. However, after that the album recognized as a masterpiece at the dawn of city pop and reissued repeatedly in the country.

As pop music adjusted to streaming delivery and city pop became popular among artists of the sample-based microgenres known as vaporwave and future funk, the album attracted the interest worldwide. The people playing on the album—including a pre-Yellow Magic Orchestra Ryuichi Sakamoto and Haruomi Hosono both, and Tatsuro Yamashita as well as Yasuaki Shimizu—also contributed to its status.

Gölz described in laut.de that in this album, Ohnuki distilled the "Shape of J-Pop to Come"—city pop—out of the zeitgeist. "The mixture of jazz, funk and pop gave birth to the album, it seems timeless in its pure beauty, yet so clearly shaped by the aesthetic conceptions of the time, which was able to only come about in exactly this line-up." Writing for Red Bull Music Academy Daily, Patrick St. Michel said that the album "proved to be a landmark in Japan's 'New Music' years, with limber jazz-fusion songs and easygoing grooves featuring lyrics about the over-prescription of medication." Laurence Green of SOAS University of London called it the best Japanese city pop album, saying, "In the midst of the floaty electric piano chords and noodling organ lines, it lays out a playground of musicianship in which Ohnuki can deliver some of the most irresistibly catchy top lines in the City Pop sub-genre." Time (Is) in Sputnikmusic wrote, "I won't go as far to say it's the 'definitive' City Pop album, but for a genre with very little to offer outside watered-down jazz funk clichés and folk pastiches, it's the closest you'll ever get to 'definitive'," and added, "To languor in decades of obscurity [...] without so much as seeing widespread reappraisal is unbecoming of an album like Sunshower, and only goes to show how ahead of its time it is [...] ."

2007 remastered CD 
In 2007, the album CD was remastered and reissued in a limited edition as one of "Taeko Ohnuki CROWN YEARS Paper Sleeve Collection". It was supervised by Ohnuki and included mini-LP replica paper sleeve, three bonus tracks, and liner notes newly written by herself.

Bonus tracks 
 "" was released as a single on 5 July 1977, and was recorded by a different arrangement and players from the track on the album.
 "Heya" (部屋; literally: "Room"), the above single's coupling song, never previously appeared on any albums. This is an Ohnuki's favorite song, "I wanted to write the lyrics with the watercolor-like image such as red, the color of the sun," she said.
 "Kouryou" (荒涼; literally: "Bleakness") by lyrics: Yumi Matsutoya and music/arrangement: Masataka Matsutoya, was included in Masataka Matsutoya's album Yoru no Tabibito —Endless Flight— that Ohnuki participated as a guest vocalist.

Release history

Track listing

2007 remastered CD

Personnel 
Credits adapted from the album's liner notes.

 Musicians 

 Ryuichi Sakamoto – keyboards (tracks 1–10)
  – keyboards (tracks 1, 5)
 Kazumi Watanabe – guitar (tracks 3, 6)
  – guitar (tracks 1–2, 4, 10)
  – guitar (tracks 1, 3, 5, 6, 8, 10)
  – guitar (track 7)
 Haruomi Hosono – bass (tracks 2, 4, 7)
 Tsugutoshi Goto – bass (tracks 1, 3, 5, 6, 8, 10)
 Chiristopher Parker – drums (tracks 1–8, 10), tambourine (track 3)
  – percussion (tracks 1–3, 5–8, 10)
 Shigeharu Mukai – trombone (track 8)
 Yasuaki 'Sec' Shimizu – saxophone (tracks 4–5)
 Tatsuro Yamashita – background vocal (tracks 1–2, 4)
 Taeko Ohnuki – background vocal (tracks 1–2, 4)

Production

 Seiji Kuniyoshi – producer
  – producer
 Taeko Ohnuki – co-producer
 Ryuichi Sakamoto – musical direction and arrangements
 Shinich Tanaka – engineering
 Hiroko Horigami, Masako Hikasa – assistance
 Kazuhiro Sato – art direction
 Tohru Ohnuki – photography

2007 remastered CD 
Musicians (bonus tracks)

 Ryuichi Sakamoto – keyboards (tracks 11–12)
 Shigeru Suzuki – electric guitar (tracks 11–12)
 Tsunehide Matsuki – electric guitar (track 11)
  – bass (tracks 11–12)
 Shuichi Murakami – drums (track 11)
 Nov Saitoh – percussion (tracks 11–13)
 Chuei Yoshikawa – acoustic guitar (track 12)
  – drums (tracks 12–13)
 Masataka Matsutoya – keyboards, vocal (track 13)
 Haruomi Hosono – Bass (track 13)
 Ryusuke Seto – Acoustic Guitar (track 13)

Production

 Taeko Ohnuki – supervision
 Yoshiro Nagato (BELIEVE IN MAGIC) – creative direction
 Masao Nakazato (ONKIO HAUS) – mastering
 Takashi Kubo (NIPPON CROWN) – production
 Sakae Yoshimoto (BELIEVE IN MAGIC) – design
 Kyoko Ooki (NIPPON CROWN) – design cooperation 
 Seiji Kuniyoshi, Natsuko Harada (PROMAX), Masami Hikasa,  – cooperation

Cover versions 
{|class="wikitable" 
 ! scope="col"| Song
 ! scope="col"| Artist(s)
 ! scope="col" style="width:30%"| Appearance
 ! scope="col"| Release date
 ! scope="col"| Format
 ! scope="col"| 
 ! scope="col"| 
 |-
 | rowspan="4"| "Tokai"
 | COUCH
 | 
 |  
 | style="text-align:center"| CD
 | CXCA-1225
 | 
 |-
 | Asako Toki
 | Summerin'''
 | 
 | style="text-align:center"| CD
 | RZCD-45913
 | 
 |-
 | Yasuyuki Okamura+Ryuichi Sakamoto
 | 
 | 
 | style="text-align:center"|2CD
 | RZCM-59438/9
 | 
 |-
 | 
 | unjour | 
 | style="text-align:center"| CD
 | shiningwill-n-1
 | 
 |}

 Notes 
 Footnotes 

 References 

 Bibliography 

 
 
  
 
 
 
 
 
 Anon.[b] (n.d). 作品 [Works]. ORICON NEWS (in Japanese). Oricon. 
 
 
 
 
 
 Anon.[c] (n.d). 新譜情報 [New Releases Information]. CDJournal.com'' (in Japanese). シーディージャーナル [CDJournal].

External links 
 

1977 albums
Japanese-language albums
Nippon Crown albums